Infinite may refer to:

Mathematics
Infinite set, a set that is not a finite set
Infinity, an abstract concept describing something without any limit

Music
Infinite (group), a South Korean boy band
Infinite (EP), debut EP of American musician Haywyre, released in 2012
Infinite (Eminem album), the debut album of American rapper Eminem, released in 1996
Infinite (Eminem song), the debut song of American rapper Eminem, released in 1996
Infinite (Stratovarius album), a studio album by power metal band Stratovarius, released in 2000
The Infinite (album), by trumpeter Dave Douglas, released in 2002
"Infinite...", a 2004 single by Japanese singer Beni Arashiro
Infinite (Notaker song), a 2016 single by American electronic producer Notaker
Infinite (rapper), a Canadian rapper
Infinite (Sam Concepcion album), the second studio album by Filipino singer Sam Concepcion
Infinite (Deep Purple album), the twentieth studio album by Deep Purple
"Infinite", a 1990 song by Forbidden from Twisted into Form

Other uses
Infinite (film), a 2021 science fiction film
"The Infinites", a 1953 science fiction short story by Philip K. Dick
The Infinites, a fictional group of cosmic beings in the Avengers Infinity comic book series
Infinite, a character in the video game Sonic Forces
Infinite Flight, a flight simulator released on 2011
Halo Infinite, 2021 video game

See also
Infinity (disambiguation)